Plato is an unincorporated community in Cedar County, Iowa, United States.

History
The classical Greek philosopher Plato is the town's namesake. The population of the community was 12 in 1902, and 30 in 1925.

References

Unincorporated communities in Cedar County, Iowa
Unincorporated communities in Iowa